Kioxia Holdings Corporation, simply known as Kioxia and stylized as KIOXIA, is a Japanese multinational computer memory manufacturer headquartered in Tokyo, Japan. It became a wholly owned subsidiary company of Toshiba Memory Holdings Corporation on March 1, 2019, and was renamed Kioxia in October 2019. In the early 1980s, while still part of Toshiba, the company was credited with inventing flash memory. In the second quarter of 2021, the company was estimated to have 18.3% of the global revenue share for NAND flash solid-state drives. The company is the parent company of Kioxia Corporation.

Name 
Kioxia is a combination of the Japanese word kioku meaning memory and the Greek word axia meaning value.

History 

In 1980, Fujio Masuoka, an engineer at Kioxia predecessor Toshiba, invented flash memory, and in 1984, Masuoka and his colleagues presented their invention of NOR flash.

In January 2014, the Toshiba Corporation completed its acquisition of OCZ Storage Solutions, renaming it OCZ and making it a brand of Toshiba.

On June 1, 2018, due to heavy losses experienced by the bankruptcy of the Westinghouse subsidiary of former parent company Toshiba over nuclear power plant construction at Vogtle Electric Generating Plant in 2016, Toshiba Memory Corporation was spun off from the Toshiba Corporation. Toshiba maintained a 40.2% equity in the new company. The new company consisted of all of Toshiba memory businesses. Toshiba Memory Corporation became a subsidiary of the newly formed Toshiba Memory Holdings Corporation on March 1, 2019.

In June 2019, Kioxia experienced a power cut at one of its factories in Yokkaichi, Japan, resulting in the loss of at least 6 exabytes of flash memory, with some sources estimating the loss as high as 15 exabytes. Western Digital used (and still uses) Kioxia's facilities for making its own flash memory chips.

On July 18, 2019, Toshiba Memory Holdings Corporation announced it would change its name to Kioxia on October 1, 2019, including all Toshiba memory companies. On October 1, 2019, Toshiba Memory Holdings Corporation was renamed Kioxia Holdings Corporation and Toshiba Memory Corporation was renamed Kioxia Corporation. This renaming also included companies associated with Toshiba's solid-state drive brand OCZ.

The acquisition closed on July 1, 2020.

In February 2022, Kioxia and Western Digital reported that contamination issues have affected the output of their flash memory joint-production factories, with WD admitting that at least 6.5 exabytes of memory output being affected. The Kiakami and Yokkaichi factories in Japan stopped producing due to the contamination.

In April 2022, Kioxia announced they will be donating 100 million yen ($790,000) to support humanitarian relief for people affected by the crisis in Ukraine.

Corporate governance 
As of April 30, 2021, Kioxia ownership is as follows:
 Bain Capital Private Equity (55.94%)
 Toshiba (40.64%)
 Hoya Corporation (3.13%)

Subsidiaries 
Kioxia Holdings Corporation is the holding company of Kioxia Corporation. Kioxia Corporation is the parent company of several companies including Kioxia Systems Company, Kioxia Advanced Package Corporation, Kioxia America, and Kioxia Europe.

References

External links
 
 

Toshiba
Computer hardware companies
Computer memory companies
Consumer electronics brands
Electrical engineering companies of Japan
Electronics companies of Japan
Electronics companies established in 2018
Corporate spin-offs
Japanese brands
Manufacturing companies based in Tokyo
Multinational companies headquartered in Japan
Privately held companies of Japan
Technology companies of Japan
Computer storage companies